The 1992 Belarusian Premier League season was the inaugural tournament for independent Belarus after the dissolution of Soviet Union. A decision was made to switch the schedule of the league to fall-spring format, therefore the first season was played as a single round-robin tournament between 18 April and 20 June 1992.

Teams and venues

The first teams to participate in the Belarusian top football league were Dinamo Minsk, a sole staple Belarusian team from Soviet Top League, four teams formerly of Soviet Second League (Dinamo Brest, Dnepr, KIM and Khimik), one team formerly of Soviet Second League B (Gomselmash) and ten teams formerly of the Football Championship of the Belarusian SSR.

Table

Results

Top scorers

See also
1992 Belarusian First League
1992 Belarusian Cup

External links
RSSSF

Belarusian Premier League seasons
1
Belarus